Edgar Chumacero (born 7 February 1980) is a Mexican fencer. He competed in the individual foil event at the 2004 Summer Olympics.

References

External links
 

1980 births
Living people
Mexican male foil fencers
Olympic fencers of Mexico
Fencers at the 2004 Summer Olympics
People from Puebla (city)
Central American and Caribbean Games silver medalists for Mexico
Competitors at the 2006 Central American and Caribbean Games
Central American and Caribbean Games medalists in fencing
21st-century Mexican people